The Arctic Basin (also North Polar Basin) is an oceanic basin in the Arctic Ocean, consisting of two main parts separated by the Lomonosov Ridge, a mid-ocean ridge between north Greenland and the New Siberian Islands. It is bordered by the continental shelves of Eurasia and North America.
 The Eurasian Basin (also Norwegian Basin) consists of the Nansen Basin (formerly: Fram Basin) and the Amundsen Basin
 The Amerasia Basin consists of the Canada Basin and the Makarov Basin

Exploration
Fridtjof Nansen and Otto Sverdrup sailed the basin in the Fram from 1893 to 1896. Between 1922 and 1924, Roald Amundsen followed in the Maud.

References

 Herman, Yvonne (July 1970) "Arctic Paleo-Oceanography in Late Cenozoic Time" Science (New Series) 169(3944): pp. 474–477.
 Olsson, Kristina, et al. (January 1999) "Carbon Utilization in the Eurasian Sector of the Arctic Ocean" Limnology and Oceanography 44(1): pp. 95–105.
"Featured Explorers", World Book, retrieved 17 August 2005.

Oceanic basins of the Arctic Ocean
Abyssal plains